The 1961-62 French Rugby Union Championship was contested by 56 teams divided in 7 pools.

The four first teams of each pool and the better fourclassified fifth were qualified for the "last 32".

Le Agen won the Championship 1961-62 after beating the Béziers in the final.

Context 
The 1962 Five Nations Championship was won by France.

The Challenge Yves du Manoir was won by Mont-de-Marsan that beat Pau par 14 - 9.

Qualification round 

In bold the qualified to "last 32" phase

"Last 32" 

In bold the clubs qualified for the next round

"Last 16" 

In bold the clubs qualified for the next round

Quarter of finals 

In bold the clubs qualified for the next round

Semifinals 

The two finalistes de 1960-61 were qualified for the semifinals, Béziers won the match for number of tries scored.

Final

External links
 Compte rendu finale de 1962 lnr.fr

1962
France 1962
Championship